Alex Parsons (born 6 January 2000) is an Australian professional footballer who plays as a forward for Sydney FC.

Club career

Youth career
Parsons played his youth career at Western Spirit before joining the Queensland Academy of Sport.

Western Pride
Parsons joined Western Pride in 2017, scoring regularly for the under-20 side, and making his senior debut late in the season.

Brisbane Roar
Parsons joined Central Coast Mariners for the 2019–20 Y-League season. He left to join Brisbane Roar's NPL Queensland side for the 2020 season.

Parsons made his professional debut on 29 December 2020 against Melbourne City, coming on as a substitute for his former Western Pride clubmate Dylan Wenzel-Halls.

References

2000 births
Living people
Association football wingers
Association football forwards
Australian soccer players